Shahumyan (also, Imeni Shaumyana, Imeni Beriya, Shaumyan, and Posëlok Imeni Shaumyana) is a town in the Yerevan Province of Armenia. The town was named after Stepan Shahumyan, a Bolshevik commissar.

References 

Populated places in Yerevan